Stephenson Underwear Mill is a historic textile mill located at South Bend, St. Joseph County, Indiana.  It was built in 1916, and is a three-story, rectangular, nine-bay reinforced concrete building with brick curtain walls.  It features a parapet with concrete coping and concrete panels on each side of the front panels. The building was rehabilitated for use as apartments in the early-1990s.

It was listed on the National Register of Historic Places in 1995.

References

Industrial buildings and structures on the National Register of Historic Places in Indiana
Industrial buildings completed in 1916
Buildings and structures in South Bend, Indiana
National Register of Historic Places in St. Joseph County, Indiana